The 1988 North Carolina gubernatorial election was held on  November 8, 1988. Popular Incumbent Governor James G. Martin ran and was re-elected by a comfortable margin over Democratic Challenger former Lieutenant Governor Robert B. Jordan III. Martin also made history by becoming the first Republican to be re-elected in North Carolina. This also marks the last occasion that the following counties have voted Republican in a gubernatorial election: Buncombe, Guilford, and Wilson.

Primary election results

General election results

Footnotes

North Carolina
1988
Lieutenant